Gustaf Eugen Bergman (8 February 1898 – 6 June 1971) was a Swedish boxer who competed in the 1924 Summer Olympics. He was eliminated by Carlos Abarca of Chile in the first round of the featherweight contest.

1924 Olympic results
Below is the record of Gustaf Bergman, a Swedish featherweight boxer who competed at the 1924 Paris Olympics:

 Round of 32: lost to Carlos Abarca (Chile) by decision

References

1898 births
1971 deaths
Featherweight boxers
Olympic boxers of Sweden
Boxers at the 1924 Summer Olympics
Swedish male boxers
Sportspeople from Stockholm
20th-century Swedish people
Djurgårdens IF boxers